William Gerard Hamilton (28 January 172916 July 1796), was an English statesman and Irish politician, popularly known as "Single Speech Hamilton".

Biography
He was born in London, the son of William Hamilton, a Scottish bencher of Lincoln's Inn, and succeeded his father in 1754. He was educated at Winchester, Lincoln's Inn and Oriel College, Oxford. With his father's fortune he entered political life and became Member of Parliament for Petersfield in Hampshire. His maiden speech, delivered on 13 November 1755, during the debate on the address, which excited Walpole's admiration, is generally supposed to have been his only effort in the House of Commons. But the nickname "Single Speech" is undoubtedly misleading, and Hamilton is known to have spoken with success on other occasions, both in the House of Commons and in the Irish parliament.

Political offices
In 1756 he was appointed one of the commissioners for trade and plantations, and in 1761 he became chief secretary to Lord Halifax, the Lord Lieutenant of Ireland, as well as MP of the Irish House of Commons for Killybegs (until 1768) and English MP for Pontefract.

He was appointed Irish Chancellor of the Exchequer in 1763, and subsequently filled various other administrative offices. Hamilton was thought very highly of by Samuel Johnson, and it is certain that he was strongly opposed to the British taxation of America. He was close to the Prince Regent, serving as a trusted adviser. In 1784 he exchanged his office as Chancellor of the Exchequer for a pension of £2,000 p.a. Hamilton had held the office for over 20 years, although had treated the role as a largely ceremonial position. He was succeeded by John Foster, who went on to bring in changes credited with greatly boosting the rural Irish economy.

Ill health and death
He suffered from a severe paralytic stroke in the winter of 1791–92. This had not been his first, and by August 1792 he remained in a poor state. On 4 March 1793 he received a leave of absence from the House of Commons due to his ill health. He died in London on 16 July 1796, and was buried in the chancel vault of St Martins-in-the-Fields. His death came "just in time to save him from absolute poverty." He was unmarried.

Two of his speeches in the Irish House of Commons, and some other miscellaneous works—including previously unpublished notes on the Corn Laws by Johnson—were published by Edmond Malone after his death under the title Parliamentary Logick.

References

Notes

Sources

External links
 William Gerard Hamilton at the Eighteenth-Century Poetry Archive (ECPA)

1729 births
1796 deaths
People educated at Winchester College
Alumni of Oriel College, Oxford
Members of Lincoln's Inn
British MPs 1754–1761
British MPs 1761–1768
British MPs 1768–1774
British MPs 1774–1780
British MPs 1780–1784
British MPs 1784–1790
British MPs 1790–1796
Irish MPs 1761–1768
Members of the Parliament of Great Britain for English constituencies
Members of the Parliament of Ireland (pre-1801) for County Donegal constituencies
Chancellors of the Exchequer of Ireland
Members of the Privy Council of Ireland
Chief Secretaries for Ireland